The 489th Attack Squadron is an active United States Air Force unit, stationed at Creech Air Force Base, Nevada and operating MQ-1 and MQ-9 unmanned aerial vehicles.  It was previously active at Beale Air Force Base, California as the 489th Reconnaissance Squadron from 2011 to 2015.

The squadron was first activated as the 77th Aero Squadron in 1917.  Redesignated as the 489th Aero Squadron, it served as a support unit in France during World War I before returning to the US and being demobilized in 1919.

Through most of its existence the squadron was named the 489th Bombardment Squadron.  It served under this name from 1925 to 1942 in the Organized Reserve.  The unit served squadron served in the Mediterranean Theater of Operations during World War II, earning two distinguished Unit Citations for actions in North Africa and Sicily.  Inactivated after the war, it served briefly in the reserves a second time between 1947 and 1949.   When Strategic Air Command reorganized its Boeing B-47 Stratojet wings as four squadron units the squadron was activated at Whiteman Air Force Base, Missouri, remaining active until 1962.

History

World War I
The squadron was first activated as the 77th Aero Squadron at Kelly Field, Texas in August 1917, and commanded by Capt. H. L. Mumma.  In September under the command of 1st Lt Kenneth M. Spence.  In November 1917 the 77th moved to the Air Depot at Garden City, New York for deployment to the American Expeditionary Force.  On 4 December 1917 the squadron moved to port of Embarkation Philadelphia and boarded the transport Northland. On the Northland were 9 Aero Squadrons with 70 officers and 1,339 enlisted men. These 9 Squadrons were the 10th, 12th, 13th, 16th, 19th, 75th, 76th, 77th and 101st.

In January 1918 a new numbering scheme for aero squadrons was set up.  The numbers 400 through 599 were reserved for Aero Squadrons (Construction).  The 77th became the 489th Aero Squadron (Construction). It served in France building facilities. The 489th returned to the States in February 1919 and went to Camp Stuart, Virginia. In March 1919 it was demobilized at Camp Lee, Virginia.

Organized Reserve
The first 489th Bombardment Squadron was constituted in the Organized Reserve in March 1924 and allotted to the Ninth Corps Area. The squadron was manned in 1925 at Boeing Field, near Seattle, Washington. It was assigned to the 349th Bombardment Group from 22 October 1925 until c. June 1929 for mobilization as part of the General Headquarters Reserve. The 489th was one of the few Air Corps units in the Organized Reserve that possessed facilities, equipment and aircraft between the wars.  In June 1932, the squadron was consolidated with the World War I Aero Squadron.  The unit typically conducted its inactive training at Pearson Field or in Seattle.  It performed its summer training at various Air Corps installations on the Pacific coastal region. The squadron was disbanded, along with all other Organized Reserve Air Corps units on 31 May 1942 and its remaining personnel were called to active duty individually.

World War II
The second  489th Bombardment Squadron was organized as a North American B-25 Mitchell medium bomber squadron in mid-1942, trained by Third Air Force in the southeastern United States. As part of the 340th Bombardment Group, the squadron deployed to IX Bomber Command of the 9th Air Force in Egypt initially in March 1943 via Air Transport Command South Atlantic Route through Caribbean, Brazil, Liberia, Central Africa and Sudan. Operated in the Tactical Bomber Force of the Northwest African Tactical Air Force primarily in support of the British 8th Army in the Tunisian Campaign and participated in the invasion of Sicily (Operation Husky) in July 1943. In August 1943, the squadron was reassigned to XII Bomber Command of the 12th Air Force and participated in the Allied invasion of Italy in September 1943. Moved to Corsica as part of the Mediterranean Allied Tactical Air Force in April 1944 and provided tactical support for Allied troops in Italy and Southern France (Operation Dragoon). Based at Rimini, Italy in April 1945 until the end of the war.

Personnel demobilized in Italy during summer of 1945; squadron returned to the United States, being prepared for deployment to Pacific Theater for use as a tactical bomb squadron in programmed Invasion of Japan.   Japanese capitulation led to squadron's inactivation in November 1945.

Return to reserve status
Activated as an A-26 Invader squadron in the postwar Air Force reserves in 1947; inactivated in 1949 due to budget reductions.

Strategic Air Command
From 1958, the Boeing B-47 Stratojet wings of Strategic Air Command (SAC) began to assume an alert posture at their home bases, reducing the amount of time spent on alert at overseas bases.  The SAC alert cycle divided itself into four parts: planning, flying, alert and rest to meet General Thomas S. Power's initial goal of maintaining one third of SAC's planes on fifteen minute ground alert, fully fueled and ready for combat to reduce vulnerability to a Soviet missile strike. To implement this new system B-47 wings reorganized from three to four squadrons. The 489th was activated at Whiteman Air Force Base as the fourth squadron of the 340th Bombardment Wing. The alert commitment was increased to half the squadron's aircraft in 1962 and the four squadron pattern no longer met the alert cycle commitment, so the squadron was inactivated on 1 January 1962.

Reconnaissance operations
The squadron was reactivated as the 489th Reconnaissance Squadron on 26 August 2011 at Beale Air Force Base near Marysville, CA as a component of the 9th Operations Group, 9th Reconnaissance Wing, flying MC-12W aircraft.  It was inactivated 10 May 2015.

489th Attack Squadron
The squadron was redesignated as the 489th Attack Squadron at Creech Air Force Base under the 432d Operations Group, on 2 December 2016.  It is equipped with MQ-1 and MQ-9 UAV aircraft.

Lineage
 489th Aero Squadron
 Organized as the 77th Aero Squadron on 13 August 1917
 Redesignated 489th Aero Squadron (Construction) on 1 February 1918
 Demobilized on 6 March 1919
 Reconstituted and consolidated with the 489th Bombardment Squadron in June 1932

 489th Bombardment Squadron
 Constituted as the 489th Bombardment Squadron on 31 March 1924 and allotted to the reserve
 Activated, date unknown (personnel assigned in January 1925)
 Consolidated with the 489th Aero Squadron in June 1932
 Disbanded on 31 May 1942
 Consolidated with the 489th Bombardment Squadron, Medium on 11 August 1958

 489th Attack Squadron
 Constituted as the 489th Bombardment Squadron (Medium) on 10 August 1942
 Activated on 20 August 1942
 Redesignated 489th Bombardment Squadron, Medium c. 20 August 1943
 Inactivated on 7 November 1945
 Redesignated 489th Bombardment Squadron, Light on 24 October 1947
 Activated in the reserve on 10 November 1947
 Inactivated on 27 June 1949
 Redesignated 489th Bombardment Squadron, Medium on 11 August 1958 and consolidated with the 489th Bombardment Squadron
 Activated on 1 October 1958
 Discontinued and inactivated on 1 January 1962
 Redesignated 489th Reconnaissance Squadron on 14 June 2011
 Activated on 26 August 2011
 Inactivated on 10 May 2015
 Redesignated 489th Attack Squadron on 1 December 2016
 Activated on 2 December 2016

Assignments
 Unknown, 13 August 1917 – February 1918
 Air Service Production Center No. 2, February–December 1918
 Unknown, December 1918 – 6 March 1919
 Ninth Corps Area, 1925 – 31 May 1942 (349th Bombardment Group for mobilization until c. June 1929)
 340th Bombardment Group, 20 August 1942 – 7 November 1945
 340th Bombardment Group, 10 November 1947 – 27 June 1949
 340th Bombardment Wing, 1 October 1958 – 1 January 1962
 9th Operations Group, 26 August 2011 – 10 May 2015
 432nd Operations Group, 2 December 2016 – present

Stations

 Kelly Field, Texas, 13 August 1917
 Garden City, New York, 5 November–4 December 1917
 St. Maixent, France, 1 January 1918
 Romorantin, France, 13 February 1918
 Brest, France, c. 4 January 1919-unknown
 Camp Stuart, Virginia, c. 8 February 1919
 Camp Lee, Virginia, February-6 March 1919
 Boeing Field, Washington, c. 1924-31 May 1942.
 Columbia Army Air Base, South Carolina, 20 August 1942
 Walterboro Army Air Field, South Carolina 30 November 1942 – 30 January 1943
 RAF Kabrit, Egypt March 1943
 Medenine Airfield, Tunisia March 1943
 Sfax Airfield, Tunisia April 1943

 Hergla Airfield, Tunisia 2 June 1943
 Comiso Airfield, Sicily, Italy, c. 2 August 1943
 Catania Airport, Sicily, Italy, 27 August 1943
 San Pancrazio Airfield, Italy c. 15 October 1943
 Foggia Airfield, Italy 19 November 1943
 Pompeii Airfield, Italy c. 2 January 1944
 Gaudo Airfield, Italy 23 March 1944
 Alesan, Corsica, France c. 15 April 1944
 Rimini Airfield, Italy c. 7 April-16 July 1945
 Seymour Johnson Field, North Carolina, 9 August 1945
 Columbia Army Air Base, South Carolina 2 October – 7 November 1945
 Tulsa Municipal Airport, Oklahoma, 31 October 1947 – 19 August 1949
 Whiteman Air Force Base, Missouri, 1 October 1958 – 1 January 1962
 Beale Air Force Base, California, 26 August 2011 -  10 May 2015
 Creech Air Force Base, Nevada, 2 December 2016 – present

Aircraft

 Curtiss B-2 Condor, 1930–1934
 North American B-25 Mitchell, 1942–1945
 Douglas A-26 Invader, 1947–1949
 Boeing B-47 Stratojet, 1958–1962
 Beechcraft MC-12W, 2011–2015
 General Atomics MQ-1 Predator, 2016–present
 General Atomics MQ-9 Reaper, 2016–present

References

 Notes

 Citations

Bibliography

External links
The 489th Bombardment Squadron on Corsica

Military units and formations in California
Attack squadrons of the United States Air Force
1917 establishments in Texas